Great Science Fiction Stories About Mars is a 1966 anthology of science fiction short stories edited by T. E. Dikty and published by Fredrick Fell.  Most of the stories had originally appeared in the magazines Startling Stories, Argosy, Thrilling Wonder Stories, Amazing Stories, Super Science Stories and Astounding SF.

Contents

 "The Red Planet", by T. E. Dikty
 "The Sound of Bugles", by Robert Moore Williams
 "Non-Stop to Mars", by Jack Williamson
 "The First Martian", by A. E. van Vogt
 "Via Etherline", by Eando Binder
 "Tin Lizzie", by Randall Garrett
 "Under the Sand-Seas", by Oliver E. Saari
 "Omnilingual", by H. Beam Piper

Reception
Algis Budrys of Galaxy Science Fiction said that "You may be rather surprised at how much pleasure you get out of this mediocre book" and "I expect you will enjoy it too".

References

External links

1966 anthologies
Science fiction anthologies
Short stories set on Mars